Chandeshwar Prasad is an Indian politician. He was elected to the Lok Sabha, lower house of the Parliament of India from Jahanabad, Bihar in the 2019 Indian general election as member of the Janata Dal (United).

References

External links
 Official biographical sketch in Parliament of India website

India MPs 2019–present
Lok Sabha members from Bihar
Living people
Janata Dal (United) politicians
1951 births